This rivalry is between Las Piñas's Perpetual Help and Mendiola's San Beda.

Also called as New Age Rivalry, Perpetual has established itself as a perennial contender for the modern times, their path to the title has always been blocked by San Beda.

The University of Perpetual Help has made the Final Four for the fifth time in the last seven seasons, only to be ousted by eventual champion San Beda College every single time.

Head-to-head record by sport

Seniors' Division

General Championship
San Beda leads the general championship race with 4-2.
San Beda (4) - 2010-11, 2011-2012, 2012-2013, 2014-2015
Perpetual (2) - 1995, 1996

Juniors' Division

General Championship
San Beda leads the general championship race with 11-0.
San Beda (11) - 1982, 1988, 1989, 1990, 1991, 1993, 1995, 1996, 1997, 2015
Perpetual (0)

Basketball Statistics

Men's basketball results
Both teams are expected to meet at least 2 times per year.

Juniors' Basketball Results

Final Four Rankings
For comparison, these are the rankings of these two teams since the Final Four format was introduced.

Seniors' division

Juniors' division

See also
San Beda Red Lions
National Collegiate Athletic Association (Philippines)
San Beda–Letran rivalry
Battle of Intramuros
San Sebastian–Letran rivalry
San Beda–San Sebastian rivalry

References

External links
NCAA historical results
NCAA Season 85 Schedules and Results
NCAA Season 86 Schedules and Results
Google News Archive
Manila Bulletin Online Newspaper Archive

National Collegiate Athletic Association (Philippines) rivalries
San Beda University
University of Perpetual Help System DALTA